Samuel Clarence Ford (November 7, 1882November 25, 1961) was an American politician who served as the 12th Governor of Montana from 1941 to 1949.

Biography
Ford was born on November 7, 1882 in Albany, Kentucky. His early education was in the public schools of Kansas and he graduated from the University of Kansas with an LL.B. in 1906. He established a legal practice as well as a public service career in Helena, Montana. He married Mary Leslie Shobe in 1910 and they had four children.

Career
Ford was a member of the Republican party. He served as Assistant U.S. Attorney for Montana from 1908 to 1914 and served as the Attorney General of Montana from 1917 to 1921. He was a Supreme Court Justice on the Montana State Supreme Court from 1929 to 1933.

Ford was elected Governor of Montana on November 5, 1940, narrowly defeating incumbent Governor Roy E. Ayers. In 1944, he was re-elected comfortably over Leif Erickson, the former Chief Justice of the Montana Supreme Court. Ford ran for re-election in 1948, but was defeated in the general election by former State Attorney General John W. Bonner, and retired from politics. During his tenure as governor, he reduced the state bureaucracy, balanced the budget, launched the Missouri River development project to provide cheap electricity to farmers. He was a delegate to the Republican National Convention in 1952.

Death
Ford died in Helena on November 25, 1961, and he is interred at Forestvale Cemetery, Helena, Lewis and Clark County, Montana US.

References

External links
 Montana Historical Society
 National Governors Association

The Political Graveyard

People from Albany, Kentucky
University of Kansas alumni
Republican Party governors of Montana
1882 births
1961 deaths
Justices of the Montana Supreme Court
Baptists from Kentucky
Montana Attorneys General
20th-century American judges
20th-century Baptists